"Come Together" is a song by American singer Chris Brown featuring vocals from singer H.E.R., taken from his ninth studio album Indigo (2019). The song was certified gold by the Recording Industry Association of America (RIAA).

Charts

Certifications

References

2019 songs
Chris Brown songs
Songs written by Chris Brown
Songs written by H.E.R.